Margaret Judson  is an American actress. A native of Arlington Heights, Illinois, she appeared on The Newsroom, an HBO drama.

Early life
Judson graduated from the University of Illinois at Urbana–Champaign in 2008 with a degree in Broadcast Journalism.

Career
Judson began her broadcast career at the NBC Page Program, where she worked with television personalities such as Lorne Michaels, Jimmy Fallon and Brian Williams. She then worked as a research assistant to Keith Olbermann on MSNBC's Countdown with Keith Olbermann.

Judson was offered a role on the TV show The Newsroom after series creator Aaron Sorkin shadowed her at MSNBC while doing research for the show. She initially was a consultant for the show, but eventually auditioned for and won the role of Tess Westin.

References

External links

Actresses from Illinois
American television actresses
Living people
1987 births
People from Arlington Heights, Illinois
21st-century American women